The siege of Oran was a battle between the Spanish Empire and the Regency of Algiers. It was started by Mustapha Bouchelaghem, the Bey of Mascara. The Algerian victory in the battle led to the city being reconquered by the Algerians for 24 years (1708–1732), before Spanish forces reconquered the town in 1732.

Background 
In 1509, Spain conquered Oran from the Algerian Kingdom of Tlemcen.  The Spanish garrison had to engage in a form of diplomacy with the local Algerian tribes, as to not get raided by them.

Despite Ottoman-Algerian attempts to seize the town, such as in 1563 all failed.

Around the start of the 18th century, relations with these tribes soured. The "peaceful Moors", tribes which engaged in commerce with the Spanish, refused to do so thanks to this drop in relations, isolating the town from North Africa, and forcing the Spanish to supply it through sea. 

In 1703, the new governor of Oran, Don Carlos Carraja raided the Algerian Beni Ameur tribes. About 80 were killed and 250 were captured.  This marked a rupture in Algerian and Spanish relations, which have been favorable since the Algerian-Moroccan war in 1701. The bey Mustapha ben Youssouf, better known by the Epithet Bouchelaghem or Bigotillos meaning man with a moustache, saw an opportunity in the Spanish War of Succession. The city, already under blockade by the Algerian navy entered a state of siege. On November 1, 1707, Ouzoum Hassan, a commander from Algiers sent his army to take the fort of Saint-Philippe, thus officially beginning the siege. The forces of the Beylik of Mascara commanded by Bouchelaghem arrived a few days later.

The battle 
The bey took control of the heights of Aïdour, from where he bombarded the Spanish, effectively destroying their defences. The Bey took control over Oran in January 20, 1708 while Mers el Kébir fell on April 4.

References

Bibliography 

 
 
 

Oran
Oran
Oran
18th century in Algeria
Oran
Oran
1707 in Africa
1708 in Africa
Spanish Oran
1707 in the Ottoman Empire